Lee Michael Norris (born September 25, 1981) is an American actor, best known for his roles as Stuart Minkus on Boy Meets World and its spin-off Girl Meets World, as well as Marvin "Mouth" McFadden on One Tree Hill.

Norris appeared as a recurring character in the first two seasons of the Boy Meets World spin-off series Girl Meets World,  reprising his role as Minkus, in which he is now the father of a teenage son Farkle Minkus (Corey Fogelmanis).

Personal life
Lee is married and has a young son, born in October 2019.

Filmography

Film

Television

References

External links

1981 births
Male actors from North Carolina
American male child actors
American male film actors
American male television actors
Living people
People from Greenville, North Carolina
Wake Forest University alumni